Café de chinos ("Chinese Coffee") is a 1949 Mexican film. It stars Carlos Orellana.
The film was produced and distributed by Astor Films, S.A.; there is no evidence this company was in any way connected with the American film production-distribution company Astor Pictures, a recent fan publication about that company notwithstanding.

External links
 

1949 films
1940s Spanish-language films
Mexican black-and-white films
Mexican comedy-drama films
1949 comedy-drama films
1940s Mexican films